Susan Schechter Bortner (published as Susan Schechter) is an American survey statistician, formerly in US Government service and now a researcher at NORC at the University of Chicago, a private nonprofit social research organization.

Education and career
Schechter graduated from Montgomery Blair High School in Maryland in 1972. She earned a bachelor's degree in criminology from the University of Maryland, College Park, and a master's degree in human development from Antioch University.

Her positions in government service included working as a survey researcher in the National Center for Health Statistics, as a senior statistician in the Office of Management and Budget, focusing on the classification of race and ethnicity, and in the United States Census Bureau, where she headed the American Community Survey from 2006 to 2010. After more than 25 years of government work, she moved to NORC at the University of Chicago in 2010, where she became Project Director for the Medicare Current Beneficiary Survey.

Recognition
Schechter was named a Fellow of the American Statistical Association in 2005. She chaired the Social Statistics Section of the American Statistical Association in 2006. In 2017, NORC gave her their Norman Bradburn Career Achievement Award.

Selected publications

References

Year of birth missing (living people)
Living people
American statisticians
Women statisticians
University of Maryland, College Park alumni
Antioch University alumni
Fellows of the American Statistical Association